Cimbrophlebiidae is an extinct family of scorpionflies. They are considered to be the sister group to the Bittacidae, together forming the clade Raptipedia.

Systematics

 †Bellicimbrophlebia Yang et al. 2013 Daohugou, China, Callovian
 †Cimbrophlebia Willmann 1977 Jurassic-Eocene, Laurasia
 †Juracimbrophlebia Wang et al. 2012 Daohugou, China, Callovian
 †Malmocimbrophlebia Bechly and Schweigart 2000 Solnhofen, Germany, Tithonian
 †Mirorcimbrophlebia Yang et al. 2013 Daohugou, China, Callovian
 †Perfecticimbrophlebia Yang et al. 2012 Daohugou, China, Callovian
 †Telobittacus Zhang 1993 Daohugou, China, Callovian Fengjiashan Formation, China, Hauterivian

An undescribed specimen is also known from the Toarcian aged "Green Series" of Germany.

References

Mecoptera
Prehistoric insect families